Great Connection is a 1974 album by Oscar Peterson.

Track listing
 "Younger Than Springtime" (Oscar Hammerstein II, Richard Rodgers) – 5:24
 "Where Do I Go from Here?" (Jerry Bock, Sheldon Harnick) – 5:53
 "Smile" (Charlie Chaplin, John Turner, Geoffrey Parsons) – 3:59
 "Soft Winds" (Fletcher Henderson, Fred Royal) – 6:44
 "Just Squeeze Me (But Please Don't Tease Me)" (Duke Ellington, Lee Gaines) – 7:28
 "On the Trail" (Harold Adamson, Ferde Grofé) – 5:51
 "Wheatland" (Oscar Peterson) – 7:11

Personnel

Performance
 Oscar Peterson – piano
 Niels-Henning Ørsted Pedersen – double bass
 Louis Hayes – drums

References

1971 albums
Oscar Peterson albums
MPS Records albums